Sumeet Dogra (born 29 November 1969) is an Indian former cricketer. He played first-class cricket for Delhi and Haryana between 1990 and 1998.

See also
 List of Delhi cricketers

References

External links
 

1969 births
Living people
Indian cricketers
Delhi cricketers
Haryana cricketers
Cricketers from Delhi